Robuck Lynch, sixth Mayor of Galway, 1489-1490.

Along with the first two mayors, (Peirce Lynch and Dominick Dubh Lynch, Robuck is believed to have been a son of John Lynch, who was father to Nicholas and John Lynch. This demonstrates the hold that the Lynch family held on the town's mayoralty from the very first years of its creation. He appeared in the will of Pierce Lynch in 1507 and appears to have been the same man elected mayor in 1501.

See also
 Tribes of Galway
 Galway

References
 History of Galway, James Hardiman, Galway, 1820.
 Old Galway, Maureen Donovan O'Sullivan, 1942.
 Henry, William (2002). Role of Honour: The Mayors of Galway City 1485-2001. Galway: Galway City Council.  

Mayors of Galway
15th-century Irish politicians
16th-century Irish businesspeople